Jeff Morris (September 20, 1934 – July 12, 2004) was an American film and television actor. Among his roles was Bob, the owner of Bob's Country Bunker, in The Blues Brothers. He later reprised his role in Blues Brothers 2000.

Biography

Born in the Missouri city of St. Joseph, he was raised in Lubbock, Texas. After high school, he went to Hollywood and worked his way into the movies. He had roles in many war films, including Private Cowboy in Kelly's Heroes and in television westerns, Death Valley Days (including the role of Morgan Earp), and Bonanza.

Morris appeared in a number of films starring Jack Nicholson, among them Goin' South, The Border, Ironweed, The Two Jakes, The Crossing Guard and Anger Management.

Filmography

The Bonnie Parker Story (1958) - Marvin
Paratroop Command (1959) - Pigpen
The Legend of Tom Dooley (1959) - Confederate Soldier
The Long Rope (1961) - Will Matthews
Kid Galahad (1962) - Ralphie
The Twilight Zone (1964, TV series) (The 7th Cavalry is Made up of Phantoms) - Finnigan
36 Hours (1965) - Bit Part (uncredited)
Bonanza (1968-1972, TV Series) - Tulsa / Hal / Turk Murphy / Matthew Brody / Dunne / Haley
Kelly's Heroes (1970) - PFC "Cowboy"
Mission Impossible  (1971-1972, TV Series) - Dan Page / Smiler
Mannix (1971,  TV series) (Murder Times Three) - Grove
Ironside (1971-1974, TV Series) - Milt Archer / Sheriff Matt Gibson / Frank Richards
Payday (1973) - Bob Tally
The Gauntlet (1977) - Desk Sergeant
Goin' South (1978) - Big Abe, Moon's Old Gang
CHiPs (1979, TV Series) - LeMasters
The Blues Brothers (1980) - Bob, the owner of Bob's Country Bunker
The Border (1982) - J.J.
Ironweed (1987) - Michigan Mac
The Freeway Maniac (1989) - Ray
The Two Jakes (1990) - Tilton
The Crossing Guard (1995) - Silas
Too Much Sleep (1997) - Bartender
Blues Brothers 2000 (1998) - Bob, the owner of Bob's Country Kitchen
Susan's Plan (1998) - Larry Cooper
The Homecoming of Jimmy Whitecloud (2001) - Jim (scenes deleted)
Anger Management (2003) - Porter (final film role)

References

External links

 Jeff Morris(Aveleyman)

1934 births
2004 deaths
Actors from St. Joseph, Missouri
Male actors from Los Angeles
Male actors from Missouri
American male film actors
American male television actors
Deaths from cancer in California
Burials at Westwood Village Memorial Park Cemetery
20th-century American male actors